Rebecca "Nini" Alcantara Ynares (born September 26, 1949) is a Filipina politician from the province of Rizal, Philippines who previously served as governor of the province from 2001 to 2004 and again from 2013 to 2022. She also served as president of Octagon Realty & Development Corporation, JNM Realty & Development Corporation, and Mar-vi Enterprise, Inc. and the director of United Coconut Planters Bank (UCPB) from 1998 to 2001. During her first term as governor, she was concurrently a director of Laguna Lake Development Authority from 2001 to 2004 and treasurer of the League of Provinces of the Philippines.

On March 25, 2020, Ynares tested positive for COVID-19.

References

1949 births
Living people
Governors of Rizal
Filipino women in politics
Nationalist People's Coalition politicians
Women provincial governors of the Philippines
Filipino Christians